A Gubernatorial election was held on 2 February 2014 to elect the next governor of , a prefecture of Japan in the northwest of the island of Kyushu.

Candidates 

Hōdō Nakamura, 63, incumbent since 2010, endorsed by LDP, Komeito, and DPJ.
Toshihiko Haraguchi, 52, secretary-general of the JCP’s Nagasaki chapter.

Results

References 

2014 elections in Japan
Nagasaki gubernational elections